Callarge sagitta  is a  butterfly found in the East Palearctic (West China and Japan) that belongs to the browns family.

Description from Seitz

C. sagitta. Whitish, yellowish beneath, with dark veins, longitudinal shadows at the costal and hind margins, and feeble 
angle-shaped markings before the margin. On the Yang-tse-kiang. Two forms are known: sagitta Leech (41a), from 
Chang-Yang on the middle Yang-tse-kiang, is the light-coloured form, while occidentalis Leech, the western form from Wa-su-kow, has the ground-colour slightly shaded with ochreous and bears strong dark vein-streaks, the distal area of both wings being shaded with fuscous. According to Leech the nymotypical form appears to be very abundant at Chang -Yang.

References

Satyrinae